William Ian DeWitt Hutt,  (May 2, 1920 – June 27, 2007) was a Canadian actor of stage, television and film. Hutt's distinguished career spanned over fifty years and won him many accolades and awards. While his base throughout his career remained at the Stratford Festival in Stratford, Ontario, he appeared on the stage in London, New York and across Canada.

Early life
Hutt was born in Toronto, Ontario, the second of three children. A graduate of Toronto's Vaughan Road Collegiate Institute (now Vaughan Road Academy), he served five years as a medic during World War II, receiving a Military Medal for "bravery in the field". After the war, he received his BA in 1948 from Trinity College at the University of Toronto, and subsequently joined the Stratford Festival of Canada for its first season in 1953.

About his early life, theatre director Richard Nielsen said, "As a young man, he was openly gay at a time when being openly gay was a very dangerous identity. He shunned violence, but he volunteered as a medic in the Second World War, and he later won the Military Medal for his services; and this I found most fascinating: he committed to a career in theatre when such a thing as the 'Canadian theatre' simply did not exist."

Acting career
Hutt's acting career was centered around the Stratford Festival where he won acclaim in many roles including those of King Lear (1988), James Tyrone in Eugene O'Neill's Long Day's Journey into Night (1994–1995) (a production which was subsequently filmed), and Lady Bracknell in The Importance of Being Earnest (1975–1979). He played such Shakespearean roles as Hamlet, Lear, Falstaff, Prospero, Macbeth and Titus Andronicus. He was Artistic Director of the Grand Theatre in London, Ontario from 1976 to 1980, and also performed at the Shaw Festival, Citadel Theatre, Royal Manitoba Theatre Centre, Vancouver Playhouse, National Arts Centre, Chichester Festival, and Bristol Old Vic.

He appeared in film and on television in such roles as Le Moyne in the 2003 film The Statement and Sir John A. Macdonald in the Canadian television production of The National Dream, as well as in Timothy Findley's The Wars.

Awards

In 1969 he was made a Companion of the Order of Canada and in 1992 he was awarded the Order of Ontario. He also received an Honorary Doctor of Letters degree from McMaster University in Hamilton, Ontario in October 1997, and in 2000 was inducted into Canada's Walk of Fame. Hutt was a recipient of a Governor General's Performing Arts Award in 1992. He was awarded the 1996 Sam Wanamaker Prize. One of the very few people in North America to have appeared on a postage stamp while still alive, he appeared on a stamp that celebrated the Stratford Festival's anniversary and showed him in character as Prospero.

In 2000, a bridge on Waterloo Street North that crosses the Avon River in downtown Stratford, Ontario, was named the "William Hutt Bridge" in his honour.  The bridge lies a few metres away from the house in which Hutt had lived for many years.

Later life and death
Hutt retired from the Stratford stage in 2005 with his most renowned role in a reprise of Prospero in The Tempest . He appeared in the television series Slings and Arrows as an ailing stage icon who wants to play King Lear one last time. He had planned to return to Stratford in 2007 in a production of A Delicate Balance, but had to cancel due to poor health.

Hutt was diagnosed with leukemia,  and died peacefully in his sleep on June 27, 2007 in Stratford, Ontario.

Filmography

Films

TV

References

External links

 
 
 
Legend Library Interview with William Hutt - Theatre Museum Canada
 William Hutt at Northern Stars — Canadians in the Movies
 Induction to the Canadian Walk of Fame

1920 births
2007 deaths
Male actors from Toronto
Canadian male film actors
Canadian male stage actors
Companions of the Order of Canada
Canadian gay actors
Deaths from leukemia
Deaths from cancer in Ontario
Members of the Order of Ontario
Trinity College (Canada) alumni
University of Toronto alumni
People from Stratford, Ontario
Dora Mavor Moore Award winners
Governor General's Performing Arts Award winners
Best Actor Genie and Canadian Screen Award winners
Canadian recipients of the Military Medal
20th-century Canadian LGBT people